The Big E, formally known as The Eastern States Exposition, is an annual fair in West Springfield, Massachusetts which opens on the second Friday after Labor Day and runs for seventeen days.  

It is billed as "New England's Great State fair", is the largest agricultural event on the eastern seaboard and the fifth-largest fair in the nation. The Big E is inclusive of all six New England states: Connecticut, Maine, Massachusetts, New Hampshire, Rhode Island, and Vermont.

History 

The first Eastern States Exposition occurred in October 1916 in West Springfield, Massachusetts and was called the Eastern States Agricultural and Industrial Exposition. All six New England states plus Delaware, New Jersey, New York, and Pennsylvania participated. It was conceived by Joshua L. Brooks as a way to help promote agriculture and educate young people with the skills and knowledge needed in agricultural vocations. The Exposition featured displays of innovations in the industry, and held contests designed to encourage farmers to better themselves through competition. 

The Boys & Girls Clubs of America partnered with the Exposition to organize youth competitions, in which prizes were awarded for best produce, jams, breads, raised hens, planting techniques, and other categories. The youth component, which drew competitors from all ten participating states, was deemed "a triumph in a new type of education." An eight-day camp program was established at Springfield's Camp Vail for all youths who placed first or second in judged competitions.

The ten-state format continued into the 1920s, with the month of the exposition moved to September. According to officials, the purpose of the "Eastern States movement" was to make the ten states "more nearly self-supporting food-wise and possess a large, prosperous and contented farming population." Emphasis on the development of young farmers continued, with the establishment of "Baby Beef Clubs" in 1920 to help youths buy, raise, exhibit, and sell livestock at the event.

The exposition began to grow beyond agriculture and industry within its first few years. In 1923, the Massachusetts Department of Health built a model schoolhouse on the fairgrounds, in which free medical and dental examinations were offered. The rise of the eugenics movement in the 1920s led to the inclusion of "Fitter Family" contests, in which prizes were awarded to individuals and families based on appearance and ethnic background. Exhibits on Native American culture were added, including a tipi exhibit hosted by Reginald and Gladys Laubin in 1926. Entertainment elements were added by the 1930s, including demonstrations of "automobile polo" (featuring acrobats playing polo while driving Ford cars), and competitive performances by high school bands.

By 1940, the exposition had begun to focus more on the six New England states. At that year's horse show in West Springfield, competitors from Delaware, New Jersey, and New York were placed in the open classes as opposed to the New England division.

In 1966, for the fiftieth anniversary, the fair began marketing itself as "The Big E." The "E" stands for what organizers said was an emphasis on "entertainment, education and excitement."

Since the first fair, only World War I and World War II, during which the military requisitioned the grounds as storage depots, and the COVID-19 pandemic have interrupted the annual tradition.

Attractions

Avenue of States

The Avenue of States contains life-size replicas of the six original New England statehouses, as well as the New England Grange House. In actuality the state houses are not replicas but rather modeled after original state houses in most instances. The buildings for New Hampshire and Vermont have no resemblance to their original state houses. 

These buildings feature exhibits and vendors that exemplify the heritage, food, and traditions of each state as a way of promoting tourism. For example, the Maine House offers lobster, blueberry, and baked potatoes, while the Vermont House has Ben and Jerry's ice cream, maple syrup, and Cabot cheese. Vendors also sell locally-made products and handicrafts. The Maine baked potatoes have become an icon, with buyers regularly joining long lines during the fair's busier periods. The Connecticut building supplies Timex watches, as well as Lego, which has its US headquarters in that state. The Rhode Island building features Del's Lemonade and Blount Seafood Clamcakes and Chowder, as well as books from a Rhode Island author C. M. Eddy, Jr. who has links back to H. P. Lovecraft and Houdini in Rhode Island.

Much like national embassies, the statehouses and the land on which they sit are owned by the respective jurisdiction. Through an arrangement with the Commonwealth of Massachusetts, they are administered by representatives from each state's police force during the Fair. Due to this distinction, tickets for each of the six lotteries can be purchased among the houses.

Livestock and animals

The Big E remains true to its agricultural roots today, with more than 7,100 4-H and FFA participants, and 1,100 open-show exhibitors, as well as educational displays and attractions.

In keeping with the fair's agricultural roots, there are many livestock displays at The Big E. The Big E Coliseum features daily horse shows, while the Mallary Complex houses livestock and other farm animals, including goats, chickens, pigs, and sheep.

Other animals, such as those found at petting zoos or in the Big E Circus Spectacular, are also featured at The Big E. There are also many 4-H youth livestock shows and a sale of the 4-H steers.

Food
Many foods representing New England cuisine can be found at The Big E, along with traditional fair foods like fried dough, corn dogs, and lemonade.  Aside from the state houses, food sellers can be found throughout the main vendor areas and around the perimeter of the fairgrounds.

Since 2000, The Big E has endeavored to introduce its own signature foods. This began in 2002 when The Big E introduced Big E Cream Puffs, which it intended to be the signature dessert of the Fair. The Big E features the cream puffs in some of its advertising; in addition, the cream puffs have been featured on local and national TV shows, including Live! with Regis and Kelly. This was followed by the introduction in 2004 of "The Big (Chocolate) Eclairs" and, in 2006, of Big E Chocolate Chip Cookies, made with Ghirardelli chocolate. In 2009, they introduced the "Craz-E Burger", which is a bacon cheeseburger on a glazed donut rather than a bun.

Vendors
Small shops are a primary attraction of the Big E. Vendors can be found across most of the fairgrounds, selling items ranging from state-specific trinkets and regional memorabilia, to household goods and clothing and accessories. Many vendors set up shops selling the same goods in multiple areas of the fair in order to attract as many customers as possible.

The Better Living Center is the largest vendor area, featuring household wares, home improvement services, cookware, and health supplements.  The International Building is home to vendors selling items from other cultures, in particular those with a common connection with many New Englanders, in particular Irish and Italian imported goods.

Concerts
The Xfinity Arena provides an open-air performing area with seating for over 6,000 people. Each weekend, big-name bands and musicians come to perform on this stage. There are ticketed shows (admission to the fair is included with the purchase of a concert ticket as long as it is purchased before the date of the show) as well as a number of free shows that are seated on a "first-come, first-served" basis.

The Court of Honor Stage, located right in the heart of the fairgrounds, also offers free concerts.

Other attractions
 Storrowton Village, where fairgoers can experience New England life from the 19th century
 The Midway, home to carnival rides and games and operated by North American Midway Entertainment. The Giant Slide is 46 feet high and 135 feet long. It was originally erected near Gate 5 in 1969 but moved to its current spot behind the Better Living Center in 1983.
 A daily Mardi Gras-style parade
 The Eastern States Coliseum, more colloquially known as the "Big E Coliseum," an arena on the grounds where numerous equestrian contests and other special events are held. The building was formerly a professional ice hockey venue.
 Animatronic Shows, namely Melody Farm Follies in the "Farm-A-Rama" section and the Billy Bob's Bear-A-Dise traveling Rock-afire Explosion show.

Other uses
The fairgrounds are used for other events throughout the year, including

 Amherst Railway Society Railroad Hobby Show
 Springfield RV Camping & Outdoor Show
 Society of Manufacturing Engineers EASTEC exposition
 Springfield Sportsmen's Show
 Equine Affaire
 Wedding & Bridal Expo

In January 2013, the Exposition joined with Hard Rock International in a proposal to build a casino and hotel on 40 acres of the fairground, in a bid for the single casino license available in Western Massachusetts. In a town referendum on September 10, the voters of West Springfield voted the project down.

Annual Visitors

References

Further reading

External links 

 

State fairs
Festivals in Massachusetts
September events
October events
Culture of Springfield, Massachusetts
Tourist attractions in Springfield, Massachusetts
Parks in Hampden County, Massachusetts
Festivals established in 1916